Thomas Westbrook (18 September 1832 – 13 September 1911) was an Australian cricketer. He played two first-class matches for Tasmania in 1858.

See also
 List of Tasmanian representative cricketers

References

External links
 

1832 births
1911 deaths
Australian cricketers
Tasmania cricketers
Cricketers from Hobart